The 1929 Saint Louis Billikens football team was an American football team that represented Saint Louis University during the 1929 college football season. In their second and final season under head coach Hunk Anderson, the Billikens compiled a 3–4–1 record and were outscored by a total of 55 to 31. The team played its home games at Public Schools Stadium (one game) and Sportsman's Park (three games) in St. Louis.

Schedule

References

Saint Louis
Saint Louis Billikens football seasons
Saint Louis Billikens football